Palaeolama is an extinct genus of laminoid camelid that existed from the Late Pliocene to the Early Holocene. Their range extended from North America to the intertropical region of South America.

Description 
Palaeolama were relatives of modern camelids that lived in the New World from the Late Pliocene to the Late Pleistocene or Early Holocene. Fossil evidence suggests that it had a slender head, elongate snout, and stocky legs. They were specialized forest browsers and are often found in association with early equids, tapirs, deer, and mammoth.

Morphology

Cranial 
Palaeolama had a long, slender skull with an elongated rostrum and robust jaw. This morphology more closely resembles the cranial morphology of Hemiauchenia than that of modern llamas.

Dental 
The jaw and dental morphology of Palaeolama distinguish it from other laminae. Palaeolama tend to have a comparatively more dorsoventrally gracile mandible. Like Hemiauchenia, Palaeolama lack their second deciduous premolars and can further be differentiated by the distinct size and shape of their third deciduous premolars. Their dentition has also been described as more brachyodont-like (short crowns, well developed roots).

Post-cranial 
Analyses of their limb elements reveal that they had shorter, stockier metapodials, and longer epipodials giving them a short, stocky appearance. Limbs such as these are typically associated with organisms adapted to walking on uneven and rugged terrains. This is also suggestive of being well adapted to avoiding predators in forested areas.

Diet 
Various dietary analyses have concluded that Palaeolama was a specialized forest browser that relied almost exclusively on plants high in C3 for subsistence. Additionally, its shallow jaw and brachydont "cheek teeth" are highly suggestive of a mixed or intermediate seasonal diet consisting of primarily leaves and fruits, with some grass. Micro-wear analyses further validate this dietary interpretation.

Group composition 
It is inferred, from observations of modern llama, that Palaeolama probably organized into bands (consisting of a single male and multiple females) and troops (consisting exclusively of young males sometimes described as "bachelors"). Typically, band territories are defended by resident males while troops remain more or less free roaming until they form bands of their own.

Habitat 
Fossil evidence suggests Palaeolama was primarily adapted to low-temperate, arid climates and preferred open, forested, and high altitude mountainous regions. The distribution of fossil evidence suggests that they had an altitudinal range limited exclusively by their dietary (vegetation) requirements. Population density is shown to be highly dependent upon access and availability of subsistence resources.

Range 
The origins of this genus are a topic of much debate as some of the earliest fossils occur during both the Irvingtonian in Florida and the Ensenadan in Uruguay. Despite this, agreement exists amongst paleobiologists on the dispersal of Palaeolama during the Great American Biotic Interchange. There is also evidence suggesting a move to northern South America during the second of two Pleistocene Camilidae migration events. Fossil evidence ranges from the southern extent of North America (including California, Florida, and Mexico) south through Central America and terminates in South America (Argentina and Uruguay).

Palaeolama mirifica, the "stout-legged llama", is known from southern California and the southeastern U.S., with the highest concentration of fossil specimens found in Florida (specifically the counties of Alachua, Citrus, Hillsborough, Manatee, Polk, Brevard, Orange, Sumter and Levy). Other fossil occurrences have been discovered in Mexico, Central America (El Salvador) and South America (Argentina, Bolivia, Brazil, Chile, Colombia, Ecuador, Paraguay, Peru, Venezuela and Uruguay).

Palaeolama major, identified by Liais in 1872, lived during the Late Pleistocene and was identified in fossil assemblages from northeastern and northern Brazil, the Pampean region of Argentina and Uruguay, northern Venezuela, and the coastal regions of Ecuador and northern Peru.

Palaeolama wedelli, identified by Gervais in 1855, lived during the Mid-Late Pleistocene with fossil specimens found in southern Bolivia and the Andean region of Ecuador.

Extinction 
Climate change, changes and reductions in the types of vegetation they relied on, and human predation are all hypothesized to have contributed to the extinction of Palaeolama during the Late Pleistocene or Early Holocene. Evidence from both the paleoecological and fossil-record suggest that Palaeolama, among other extinct camelids, weathered a number of glacial and interglacial episodes throughout their existence in North and South America. Their disappearance in some regions has been shown to coincide with a change in climate (to warmer, humid conditions) occurring at the end of the Pleistocene (also known as the Late Quaternary Warming) suggesting an inability to persevere. This hypothesis is further supported by paleoecological evidence suggesting post-megafaunal extinction shifts in vegetation and whole ecosystems.

See also

List of North American animals extinct in the Holocene
List of South American animals extinct in the Holocene

References

Prehistoric camelids
Pleistocene mammals of South America
Prehistoric mammals of North America
Pleistocene even-toed ungulates
Prehistoric even-toed ungulate genera
Fossil taxa described in 1869
Pliocene Argentina